"Then Again" is a song written by Jeff Silbar and Rick Bowles, and recorded by American country music group Alabama.  It was released in September 1991 as the first single from their compilation album Greatest Hits Vol. II.  The song reached number 4 on the Billboard Hot Country Singles & Tracks chart in December 1991.

Chart performance
"Then Again" debuted at number 61 on the U.S. Billboard Hot Country Singles & Tracks for the week of September 28, 1991.

Year-end charts

References

1991 singles
1991 songs
Alabama (American band) songs
Song recordings produced by Josh Leo
RCA Records singles
Songs written by Rick Bowles
Songs written by Jeff Silbar